Roy Hurdley is a Panamanian boxer. He competed in the men's lightweight event at the 1972 Summer Olympics. At the 1972 Summer Olympics, he lost in his first fight to Ivan Mikhailov of Bulgaria.

References

Year of birth missing (living people)
Living people
Panamanian male boxers
Olympic boxers of Panama
Boxers at the 1972 Summer Olympics
Place of birth missing (living people)
Lightweight boxers
20th-century Panamanian people